Liebert may refer to:

 Liebert (surname)
 Liebert (company)

See also
 Mary Ann Liebert, Inc., publishing company
 Libert (disambiguation)
 Lippert